Chana Katan (born 9 September 1958) is an American-born Israeli gynecologist, teacher, author, and public figure.

Biography 
Katan established and directed the IVF unit at Laniado Hospital (Netanya, Israel). She founded the wellness center for women in Kiryat Sefer, and the sexology clinic at the Shaare Zedek Medical Center. Since 2012, she has written a regular column in the weekly magazine "B'Sheva" on the topics of Medical Ethics, Family and Judaism. She is married to Yoel Katan and they have 13 children.

Selected works 
Chayei Isha – 2013
Chayei Mishpacha – 2014
Beyachad – 2016

Awards 
"Woman of the Year" – Emunah – 2011 
"Katz Prize" – 2015

References 

1958 births
Living people
American emigrants to Israel
Israeli women writers
Israeli gynaecologists
Jewish American writers
Jewish women writers
21st-century American Jews